May Muzaffar (born 1940) is a Jordan-based Iraqi poet, short story writer, translator, and editor.

Early life and education 
May Muzaffar was born in Baghdad, Iraq, in 1940. She attended the University of Baghdad, where she studied English literature.

Writing 
Muzaffar is known for her work as a writer of poetry and short stories, as well as literary criticism.  She has produced five story collections, including Al Baja (1973). In addition, she has published five poetry collections, including Layliyyat ("Nocturnes," 1994), Barid al-Sharq ("Mail from the Orient," 2003), and Ghiyab ("Absence," 2014).

Her work has been published in English translation, including in the 2000 collection The Poetry of Arab Women A Contemporary Anthology. She has also written nonfiction, including a biography of the writer .

She has also worked as a translator and editor. Her translations into Arabic include poetry from Ted Hughes and Etel Adnan, and she has served as a contributing editor to the Bahraini literary journal Thaqafat.

Her writing from the 1970s to 1990 is seen as an important example of Iraqi women writers prevailing despite state censorship and discrimination. In 1991, she left Iraq for Amman, Jordan, where she continues to reside and work, as part of a wave of Iraqi writers and artists who emigrated in this period.

Personal life 
May Muzaffar was married to the late Iraqi artist Rafa al-Nasiri. The couple often collaborated, including on the poetry collection/art book From That Distant Land in 2007. Since his death in 2013, she has worked to preserve and promote his work and legacy.

References 

Living people
1940 births
People from Baghdad
Iraqi emigrants to Jordan
Iraqi women poets
Iraqi women writers
Iraqi translators
University of Baghdad alumni
English–Arabic translators